Héninel is a commune in the Pas-de-Calais department in the Hauts-de-France region of France.

Geography

Population

Places of interest
 The church of St. Germain, rebuilt, as was most of the village, after the First World War.
 The Commonwealth War Graves Commission cemeteries.
 Traces of an old castle.

See also
Communes of the Pas-de-Calais department

References

External links

 The Heninel-Croiselles CWGC cemetery
 The Heninel CWGC cemetery

Communes of Pas-de-Calais